Summerston railway station is a railway station serving the Summerston area of Glasgow, Scotland. Services are provided by ScotRail on behalf of Strathclyde Partnership for Transport.

The route on which it stands though is considerably older, being opened in 1858 by the Glasgow, Dumbarton and Helensburgh Railway and later used by West Highland Line to reach Queen Street High Level and the former Edinburgh and Glasgow Railway main line.  Services initially terminated at Maryhill when the line first opened, but were subsequently extended through to Anniesland in 2005 to give access to the North Clyde Line.

Services

With the timetable revision that started on 18 May 2014, a limited hourly Sunday service now operates on this route between 09:30 and 19:00.

References

External links

Railway stations in Glasgow
Railway stations opened by British Rail
Railway stations in Great Britain opened in 1993
Railway stations served by ScotRail
SPT railway stations
Maryhill